San Bernardino High School (SBHS) is an American public high school and city located at 1850 North E Street within San Bernardino, California and a member of the San Bernardino City Unified School District. SBHS was granted charter as a city in 1963, under the name Cardinal City after the school's mascot, the Cardinal.  SBHS is the oldest high school in the City of San Bernardino.

History
San Bernardino High School was officially established when residents of the San Bernardino, California approved a $60,000 bond for construction of a high school in 1891. Construction of a three story-building at the southwest corner of Eighth and E Streets was completed in 1892 and received state accreditation in 1893 as San Bernardino Polytechnic High School. In 1915, after enrollment had exceeded 400 students, a new campus was built consisting of five main buildings.

In 1963, California Governor Edmund G. Brown granted the SBHS a city charter under the name Cardinal City.

Academics
San Bernardino High School has a wide range of academic classes with regular 'College Prep', 'Honors' and Advanced Placement classes.The school offers the AVID program as well. SBHS has exemplary Mock Trail,
Academic Decathlon. numerous SBHS students are members of National Honors Society, Spanish Honors Society, Quill and Scroll Journalism Honors Society, International Thespian Honors Society and the National Art Honors Society.

Notable alumni

Byron Russell (1989) (NBA Player) 
Thomas L. Bass, Class of 1953 - NFL Coach
Philip Michael Thomas (1967) - Actor
Glen Bell, Jr. (1941) - Founder of Taco Bell
Hoyt Curtin (1940) - Composer of cartoon themes
Jack H. Brown (1956) CEO of Stater Bros.
Donald T. Campbell (1934) Psychology Professor, Member of The National Academic of Sciences
Patricia Carpenter (1940) - Professor, Musician
Jerry Lewis (California Politician) (1952) California Assembly Member, U.S. Representative Member
Wilmer Amina Carter (1958) California Assembly Member
Kenneth M. Carr (1941) -Vice Admiral US Navy,  Commander-in-Chief US Atlantic Fleet
Chester F. Carlson (1924) - Inventor of Electrophotography, Founder Xerox Corporation
Neal T. Baker (1942) Founder of Baker's Drive-Thru
 James E. Cunningham (1935) - California State Senator
 Kenneth Dyal (1928) - United States Representative
 John Fiscalini (1944) - Minor League Baseball player, Fiscalini Field is named in his honor
 Mel Nelson (1954) - Major League Baseball Player
 Dee Fondy (1942) - Major League Baseball Player
 George Lewis (1960) NBC TV news correspondent
 Alexander Mattison (2016) NFL running back for the Minnesota Vikings
 Carole Landis (1934) American Actress
 Rosilicie Ochoa Bogh (1991) Yucaipa-California Joint Unified School District Board Member (2018–20), California State Senator (2020–present)

References

Education in San Bernardino, California
Educational institutions established in 1885
1885 establishments in California
High schools in San Bernardino County, California